Al Raed Saudi Football Club ( Nādī ar-Rāʾid, "Pioneer Club") is a Saudi football club based in Buraidah, and the first of its kind in the Qassim region of Saudi Arabia. One of the club's notable founders is Abdulaziz Al-Aboudi. Established in 1954, Al Raed have played in the Saudi Pro League, the top division of Saudi football, since 2008.

History
The team was able to qualify for the Premier League Saudi Arabia, in 1980–1981. It fought Club K in the qualifiers held in Riyadh. In 1986 it was the first team from the Qassim region to enter the Saudi Premier League. The team repeated this ascension to the Premier League at the end of 1989, 1992, 1998, 2002 and 2007. The Senyhassad junior team reached the Saudi Premier League clubs for juniors in 1999, and in 2003.

Honours

Saudi First Division League
Winners (1): 1991–92, 2007–08
Runners-up (4): 1985–86,1988–89, 1998–99, 2001–02

Current squad 
As of Saudi Professional League:

Out on loan

Managers

 El-Sayed El-Attiyah (1980–81)
 Joel Castro (1990–91)
 Mahmoud El-Khawaga (1991)
 China (1998–99)
 Senad Kreso (July 1, 2000 – November 25, 2000)
 Marco Cunha (November 25, 2000 – February 13, 2001)
 China (February 13, 2001 – January 7, 2002)
 Abdulaziz Al-Owdah (January 15, 2002 – May 1, 2002)
 José Fernandes (July 1, 2002 – September 22, 2002)
 Hani El Antabli (caretaker) (September 22, 2002 – October 24, 2002)
 Gainete (October 24, 2002 – December 28, 2002)
 Yousef Khamees (December 28, 2002 – April 27, 2003)
 Hani El Antabli (caretaker) (April 27, 2003 – October 8, 2003)
 Viorel Kraus (October 8, 2003 – January 30, 2004)
 Abdulaziz Al-Owdah (February 4, 2004 – February 13, 2004)
 Hani El Antabli (caretaker) (February 13, 2004 – February 25, 2004)
 Khalil Al-Masri (February 25, 2004 – May 1, 2004)
 Luis Ferreira (July 10, 2004 – March 21, 2005)
 Abdulaziz Al-Owdah (March 21, 2005 – April 24, 2005)
 Mohammed Al-Nodali (caretaker) (April 24, 2005 – September 1, 2005)
 Aboud El Khodary (September 1, 2005 – November 14, 2005)
 Khalil Al-Masri (November 17, 2005 – February 12, 2006)
 Khalid Al-Koroni (February 12, 2006 – May 1, 2006)
 Mohammed Aldo (May 4, 2006 – December 21, 2008)
 Luís Antônio Zaluar (December 29, 2008 – June 1, 2009)
 Acácio Casimiro (June 21, 2009 – October 4, 2009)
 Edison Mario Souza (October 4, 2009 – May 30, 2010)
 Lucho Nizzo (July 15, 2010 – November 7, 2010)
 Eurico Gomes (November 7, 2010 – October 17, 2011)
 Hafez Al-Hoarbi (caretaker) (October 17, 2011 – October 28, 2011)
 Ammar Souayah (October 28, 2011 – February 1, 2013)
 Vlatko Kostov (February 2, 2013 – June 1, 2013)
 Noureddine Zekri (June 26, 2013 – February 14, 2014)
 Emad Al-Sulami (caretaker) (February 14, 2014 – March 2, 2014)
 Marc Brys (March 2, 2014 – May 1, 2014)
 Vlatko Kostov (May 31, 2014 – September 1, 2014)
 Emad Al-Sulami (caretaker) (September 1, 2014 – October 7, 2014)
 Marc Brys (October 7, 2014 – March 24, 2015)
 Ammar Souayah (March 24, 2015 – May 19, 2015)
 Abdelkader Amrani (June 8, 2015 – August 29, 2015)
 Takis Lemonis (September 3, 2015 – February 1, 2016)
 Reda Hakam (caretaker) (February 1, 2016 – February 4, 2016)
 Aleksandar Ilić (February 4, 2016 – June 17, 2016)
 Nacif Beyaoui (June 17, 2016 – May 14, 2017)
 Taoufik Rouabah (June 4, 2017 – October 1, 2017)
 Ciprian Panait (October 4, 2017 – February 5, 2018)
 Aleksandar Ilić (February 5, 2018 – June 1, 2018)
 Besnik Hasi (July 26, 2018 – June 1, 2021)
 Pablo Machín (June 19, 2021 – January 26, 2022)
 João Pedro Sousa (January 26, 2022 – May 24, 2022)
 Yousef Al-Ghadeer (June 6, 2022 – June 28, 2022)
 Marius Șumudică (June 30, 2022 – )

References

 
Raed
Raed
Buraidah
Raed
Raed